Lucie Křížková (née Lucie Váchová, born 4 August 1984 in Příbram, Czechoslovakia) is a beauty queen who won Miss Czech Republic as an 18-year-old and represented her country in Miss World 2003 in China.

References

1984 births
Living people
Czech beauty pageant winners
Czech female models
Miss Universe 2004 contestants
Miss World 2003 delegates
People from Příbram
University of West Bohemia alumni